Heydarkhani (also Romanized as Ḩeydarkhānī) is a village in Kunani Rural District, Kunani District, Kuhdasht County, Lorestan Province, Iran. At the 2006 census, its population was 1,315, in 278 families.

References 

Towns and villages in Kuhdasht County